Untersee (German: lower lake) may refer to:

Lake Untersee, Antarctica
Untersee (Lake Constance), section of Lake Constance

See also
Obersee (disambiguation)